Derek Thompson may refer to:
Derek Thompson (actor) (born 1948), British actor
Derek Thompson (sports commentator) (born 1950), British presenter and commentator of horse racing
Hoodlum Priest (musician) (actually Derek Thompson, active since 1989), English musician
Derek Thompson (baseball) (born 1981), American baseball player
 Derek Thompson, character in the 2010 Canadian-American film Tooth Fairy
Derek Thompson (journalist) (born 1986), American journalist

See also
Derick Thomson (1921–2012), Scottish Gaelic poet and academic